Cyrtopera is a genus of radiolarians in the family Theoperidae.

References

External links 
 

Polycystines
Radiolarian genera